Ass, Gas or Cash (No One Rides for Free) is the only solo studio album by the American rapper K-Dee. It was released on November 15, 1994, via Lench Mob Records. Recording sessions took place at Lench Mob Studios in Los Angeles, California, with producers Ice Cube, Madness 4 Real, Vic C., 88 X Unit, Shaquille, D Mac and Laylaw. It features guest appearances from Bootsy Collins, Morris Day, Ice Cube, Ayana Anderson and Snow. The album peaked at number 33 on the Top R&B/Hip-Hop Albums chart and number 20 on the Heatseekers Albums chart in the United States. It spawned three singles: "Thought I Saw a Pussy Cat", "The Freshest MC in the World" and "Hittin' Corners".

Track listing 

Sample credits
Track 1 contains an interpolation of "War of the Hearts" written by Helen Folasade Adu and Stuart Matthewman
Track 4 contains an interpolation of "Free" written by Deniece Williams, Hank Redd, Nathan Watts and Susaye Greene
Track 7 contains an interpolation of "Gigolos Get Lonely Too" written by Morris Day
Track 8 contains an interpolation of "Why Can't We Be Friends?" written by Thomas Sylvester Allen, Harold Ray Brown, Morris Dickerson, Lonnie Jordan, Charles Miller, Lee Oskar, Howard E. Scott and Jerry Goldstein
Track 11 contains an interpolation of "U Send Me Swingin'" written by Larry Waddell, Jeffrey Allen, Ricky Kinchen, Keri Lewis, Homer O'Dell and Stokley Williams
Track 14 contains an interpolation of "Into You" written by George Clinton

Personnel 

 Darrell L. Johnson – rap vocals
 O'Shea Jackson – vocals (tracks: 10, 18), producer (tracks: 4, 7, 10, 11, 13, 14, 18), mixing, executive producer
 William Earl Collins – vocals (tracks: 10, 18), bass (tracks: 10, 14)
 Ayana Anderson – vocals (track 4)
 Morris E. Day – vocals (track 7)
 Snow – vocals (track 16)
 Natasha Walker – backing vocals (tracks: 2, 13, 14)
 Darryl "D' Style" White – backing vocals (tracks: 3, 6, 14)
 Nicole Chaney – backing vocals (tracks: 2, 13)
 Cisco – backing vocals (tracks: 4, 13)
 Nanci Fletcher – backing vocals (tracks: 10, 14)
 The Unda Covers – backing vocals (track 2)
 Alysse Manning – backing vocals (track 10)
 Ferry Freeman – backing vocals (track 10)
 Dap – backing vocals (track 16)
 Emmanual Dean – keyboards (tracks: 3, 14)
 Clint Stokes III – keyboards (tracks: 4, 7, 13)
 George Bernard Worrell, Jr. – keyboards (track 10)
 Mark Cross – keyboards (track 13)
 Warryn Cambell – additional keyboards (track 16)
 James "Tre" Rabb – guitar (tracks: 4, 7, 13)
 Dirty Mug – guitar (tracks: 10, 14)
 Clint Sands – bass (tracks: 4, 7, 13)
 Derrick McDowell – producer (track 1)
 Larry Goodman – producer (track 1)
 Lasse Bavngaard – producer (tracks: 2, 16)
 Nicholas Kvaran – producer (tracks: 2, 16)
 Rasmus Berg – producer (tracks: 2, 16)
 Jesper Dahl – producer (tracks: 2, 16)
 Shaquil Tajh Allah – producer (track 3)
 Victor "Vic C" Conception – producer (tracks: 6, 11)
 Michael Keith Simmons – producer (track 8)
 Victor Nathan Taylor – producer (track 8)
 Chris Puram – mixing
 Keston E. Wright – mixing

Chart history

References

External links

K-Dee albums
1994 debut albums
Albums produced by Laylaw